The Diocese of Noli was a Roman Catholic diocese located in the town of Noli of Liguria, Italy, in the Province of Savona. In 1820, it was united with the Diocese of Savona to form the Diocese of Savona e Noli.

Bishops

Diocese of Noli
Erected: 1239
Latin Name: Naulensis

Giorgio Fieschi (Flisco) (1447–1448 Resigned)
Paolo Giustiniani (1460–1485 Died)
Domenico Vaccari (1485–1502 Appointed, Bishop of Ventimiglia)
Antonio Ferrero (1504–1504 Appointed, Bishop of Gubbio)
Vincenzo Boverio (1506–1519 Died)
Vincenzo d'Aste (1525–1534 Died)
Girolamo Doria (1534–1549 Resigned)
Massimiliano Doria (1549–1572 Died)
Leonardo Truchi (Trucco) (1572–1587 Died)
Timoteo Berardi, O. Carm. (1587–1616 Died)
Angelo Mascardi (1616–1645 Died)
Stefano Martini (1646–1687 Died)
Giacomo Porrata (1687–1699 Died)
Paolo Andrea Borelli, B. (1700–1710 Died)
Giuseppe Saoli Bargagli, C.R.M. (1710–1712 Died)
Marco Giacinto Gandolfo (1713–1737 Died)
Costantino Serra, C.R.S. (1737–1746 Appointed, Bishop of Albenga)
Antonio Maria Arduini, O.F.M. Conv. (1746–1777 Died)
Benedetto Solari, O.P. (1778–1814 Died)

25 November 1820: United with the Diocese of Savona to form the Diocese of Savona e Noli

References

Former Roman Catholic dioceses in Italy